Kevin "Captain N" Keene, is the titular fictional character in the toyline and animated television series, Captain N: The Game Master (1989–91), which is part of the Nintendo franchise, the character additionally serving as a former mascot of Nintendo of America. In the comic series of the same name, Kevin serves as the primary love interest for Samus Aran, both united against their archenemy Mother Brain.

In both series, Kevin is summoned to Videoland from the real world by the Ultimate Warp Zone as the fabled Game Master known as "Captain N", to serve as a warrior of the Videoland royal family, using his outside knowledge of their universe (which in his own are various video games) to protect it from invasion.

In the toyline, he is the principal hero.

In Captain N: The Game Master (1989–1991)

The character Captain N first appeared in Nintendo Power magazine, created by a Nintendo staff member and magazine editor named Randy Studdard (who presented Nintendo with a formal proposal that included the character as a company spokes-character, the origin and premise and the Saturday morning cartoon as part of the entire marketing campaign). The original concept involved Captain N (originally known as "Captain Nintendo") as a Nintendo employee and the Mother Brain as piece of programming from a Nintendo game pak (that was infused in an explosion with experimental "organic" ROMs) that went rogue. Captain N had the power to temporarily give life to characters and items from Nintendo games.

The story left a door open for a sequel (Mother Brain is temporarily defeated but her return was said to be inevitable and Captain N vows to stop her when the time comes). Nintendo of America, Inc. later decided to follow Studdard's ideas and create a cartoon series, opting neither to credit nor to compensate its creator. DIC Entertainment was shopped as the animation studio and changed various aspects of the original idea while keeping the main premise of the Captain opposing Mother Brain as he interacted with a number of video game characters.

Fictional character biography
In DIC Entertainment's Captain N: The Game Master cartoon series, Kevin Keene, while playing Mike Tyson's Punch-Out!!, is sucked through his television (alongside his dog Duke) by the Ultimate Warp Zone, fulfilling the Legend of Videoland, that a young warrior from another land would be warped to their world and lead Princess Lana (the ruler of Videoland) to victory. Kevin is selected to lead the N-Team, which consists of Lana, Simon Belmont, Mega Man and Pit "Kid Icarus", none of whom show any confidence in Kevin's ability in the beginning. However, after Lana is kidnapped by shortly after Kevin's arrival, the reluctant group puts their differences aside to go on a rescue mission where Kevin eventually gains the others' confidence. During the second season, a sentient human-sized supercomputer known as "Game Boy" additionally joins the team.

The protagonist of the series, Kevin is a reluctant hero and is often found at odds with the rest of the N-Team; in many episodes, he tries to foster a big-brotherly role to characters suffering from a particular plight. He is most often called Captain N by the other cast members, except Princess Lana who regularly addresses him by his first name. His last name is only ever mentioned in two episodes. He wears light denim jeans, a yellow shirt and a red letterman jacket with white sleeves. The varsity letter "N" on his jacket is for swimming.

Duke
Kevin is also the owner of a Golden Retriever named Duke, who jumps into the Ultimate Warp Zone immediately after Kevin was sucked in and ends up in Videoland as well. Duke is usually with Kevin through all the action in a given episode and sometimes sees his own independent bouts of action. Duke wears a bandanna around his neck, and is voiced by Tom Wright.

In Videoland, Duke takes on an appearance more resembling a beagle than a Golden Retriever, while his intelligence levels are increased a hundredfold. Nonetheless, he shows occasional uncontrollable typical dog behavior, like the chase reflex. He also appears in the Captain N: The Game Master comic series, where-in he befriends Samus Aran.

Powers, abilities and equipment
In the first series, Kevin is armed with a belt and holster equipped with a Power Pad and a NES Zapper, respectively being a device which can stop time, allowing him to leap over objects or give him super-speed over short distances and a raygun which destroys his enemies and shoots Tetris blocks.

In the second series, he has technopathic abilities as in the original character pitch, as well as an interest in spacefaring.

Adaptions

Comics

The Captain N comic book was published by Valiant Comics as part of the Nintendo Comics System in 1990. Despite being based on the television cartoon of the same name, it had a more serious tone, delving into the wider effects of the N-Team's conflict with Mother Brain against the galaxy at large, and including serial storytelling. Following an older Kevin, leading the N-Team following the departure of Simon Belmont and Mega Man, the groups meet famed bounty hunter and hero Samus Aran, who falls in love with Kevin, and becomes Lana's rival for his affections. When asked by a fan why Samus did not appear in the television series, Jeffrey Scott said that he never heard about her. An article at 1UP.COM describes Samus as "rambunctious, reckless, and gets into @#!*% contests with Lana over Kevin's affections, which makes for some of the most entertaining situations in the series". The reviewer added: "Not to say that the deadly quiet, contemplative Samus who fights for truth and justice in the more recent Metroid games isn't awesome, but there's something compelling about a Samus who's greedy and conniving – and is proud to admit it."<ref>"Funny Pages. 1UP.COM. 1. Retrieved October 16, 2008.</ref>

Potential film
In April 2020, Noel Clarke expressed interest in developing a live-action Captain N: The Game Master'' film, as the next project that he intends to pursue.

Reception
Rolling Stone and Variety listed the original incarnation of the character as a "testamant to the 80s [and] marketing" and a "capture [of] the imaginations of many Nintendo fans". The character has also received negative reception for serving as essential advertisement and propaganda for Nintendo merchandising.

References

Television characters introduced in 1989
Fictional characters who use magic
Fictional commanders
Fictional captains
Fictional humanoids
Extraterrestrial superheroes
Fictional technopaths
Fictional military captains
Fictional hackers
Fictional shapeshifters
Male characters in animation
Male characters in television
Teenage characters in comics
Teenage characters in television
Teenage characters in video games
Child superheroes
Nintendo protagonists
Video game mascots